Olive greenbul may refer to:

 Baumann's olive greenbul, a species of bird found in West Africa 
 a subspecies of Cabanis's greenbul, a bird found in east-central and south-central Africa
 Yellow-bearded greenbul, a species of bird found in West Africa

Birds by common name